Part Eighteen (Part XVIII) of the Constitution of Albania is the last of eighteen parts. Titled Transitory and Final Dispositions, it consists of 8 articles.

Transitory and Final Dispositions

References

18